Amr Mostafa Mohamed Alsayed Abulmagd (born 31 December 1979), better known as Amr Mostafa, is an Egyptian singer and composer. He has composed several hit songs for artists like Amr Diab, Mohamed Hamaki, etc. He worked with western arrangers in one of his album and is known for introducing new type of music in Egypt.

Discography 
Ayamy (2007)Alama Fi Hyatak (2008)Al Kebeer Kebeer (2009)Liebt Ma'a Al-Asad (2019)

 Awards and notable works 
 Best Egyptian Composer for years 2000 and 2002 for "Aktar Wahed Beyhebak", 2003 for "Ana Ayesh", 2004 for "Aweeny Beek", 2005 for "Wemalo".
  World Music Award for Samira Said's album Yom Wara Yom (contains 5 songs composed by Amr Mostafa)
 Mohamed Hamaki's song "Ahla Haga Fiki" composed by Amr was awarded by Mobinil as best song in 2006.
 Mohamed Hamaki's album Kheles El Kalam contained 4 songs composed by Amr Motafa and was awarded a platinum CD by EMI in 2006.
 Mobinil Music Awards named Mostafa as best composer in 2006.
 Amr Mostafa's album Alama Fe Hayatak'' was named by EMI as "The Ultimate Album Of The Year 2008".

He composed several hit songs for top artists in Middle East. Some of his notable works include:

 Agmal Qesset Hob - Hossam Habib
 Ared Leeh - Assala
 Boshret Khair - Hussain Al Jassmi
 Yalla Naeesh - Ahmed Gamal
 El Alem Allah - Amr Diab
 Baeterif - Amr Diab
 Khalena Ne3ish - Mohamed Hamaki
 Kan We Kan - Mohamed Hamaki
 Mel Bedaya - Mohamed Hamaki
 Gowa Fe Alby - Hisham Abbas
 Khalik Fakrny - Amr Diab
 Sadaany Khalas - Amr Diab
 Neoul Aih - Amr Diab
 Wayah - Amr Diab
 Enta Akher Wahid - Sherine
 Youm Wara Youm - Samira Said
 Saharouni El-Leil - Ragheb Alama
 Ahla Haga Feeky - Mohamed Hamaki
 Omroh Ma Yeghib - Mohamed Hamaki
 Agmal Youm - Mohamed Hamaki
 Munaya - Moustafa Amar
 Meen Gherak - Moustafa Amar
 Ya Habibi La - Amr Diab
 We Malo - Amr Diab
 Ana Ayesh - Amr Diab
 El Lilady - Amr Diab
 Ana Aktar Wahed - Amr Diab
 Aweeny Beek - Samira Said
 Ya Ghaly Alaya - WAMA Band

References

External links
 Official Website
 Official Fans Website

21st-century Egyptian male singers
1979 births
Egyptian composers
Living people